Tryńcza  (Tryncha) is a village in Przeworsk County, Subcarpathian Voivodeship, in south-eastern Poland. It is the seat of the gmina (administrative district) called Gmina Tryńcza.

The village has a population of 2,000.

References

Villages in Przeworsk County